Krishna Stott is a British independent filmmaker, game-maker, writer, interactive media artist, and transmedia creator. Hailing from Shropshire, he has been based in Manchester, UK, since the early-1990s. He is best known for Crimeface (2008), an online interactive film thriller / police procedural described by Pocket-Lint as being 'a glimpse of the future for on-screen fiction'. This interactive film, staring Craig Cheetham (Life on Mars, Peter Kay's Max & Paddy's Road to Nowhere), went on to be a double winner at the 2008 Webby Awards. Subsequently, he created the transmedia experience Bolton Storyworld: Codename Winterhill (2011-2016), which starred David Crellin (Emmerdale, The Cops, Coronation Street, Waterloo Road). The project was selected for The Seattle Transmedia and Independent Film Festival in 2016, and won the prestigious Premier Award at the Learning on Screen Awards the same year.

Beginning his career as a filmmaker, Stott soon moved toward creating interactive media, including interactive music videos, both guerrilla (Big Audio Dynamite) and commissioned (Barry Adamson). During this period he also collaborated extensively with the band I Am Kloot, filming a live concert for release on DVD and making music videos, including their single 'Proof' (2004) starring Christopher Eccleston (Doctor Who, The Leftovers). Soon after this he worked with filmmaker Terence Davies on a companion piece to the director’s award winning documentary Of Time and the City (2008), a community-based website of user generated content titled People’s Stories (2009-2010). After experimenting with mobile phone story-games during the late 2010s with projects such as Secret Story Network (2017-present), in 2022 he announced his most recent project, the forthcoming Clive is a Good Guy (originally titled The Mirror Gag) starring Neil Bell (Shameless, 24 Hour Party People, Dead Man's Shoes, Dune) in multiple roles. Stott is also an industry influencer, most recently in 2022 curating The Modern Audience Conference, securing the participation of headline speakers such as three-time Emmy Awards winner Bernie Su and video game director Yoko Taro; as well as appearing at Digital Dragons – the leading European games industry conference – in Krakow, Poland.

Biography

Early Life 
Stott was born in December 1968 in Shropshire, the 'farmlands of the Midlands' in the UK. He ‘grew up obsessing about music and films’ but his abiding memory and 'first love aged 7 years old was a tape recorder' which he used 'to document and replay' the world around him. He later developed an interest in early computer games and in his teenage years played in bands - but eventually became personally dissatisfied with that means of self-expression, although retaining a close affinity with music, as his later career would attest.

Working Life 
Moving around the UK, Stott had brief forays in all kinds of work, including stone masonry, before winding up in Manchester in the early 1990s where he still lives and works today. As Stott recounts in the 'Intro: Before Interactive Media' chapter in Set the Storyworld to Random (2015), by the mid-1990s he was freelancing for many different media production companies in lots of disparate roles. ‘Some of the jobs I took to pay the bills were truly awful’, he writes, ‘disastrous wedding films, corporate video nightmares and occasional slots for TV’, including local news items. During this time he was attempting to get his own projects off the ground, which were initially in the domain of 'film making until an Apple Mac 660AV stopped me in my tracks in the mid 90’s and led me down the golden path to interactive media'. Since this time Stott has worked mostly in interactive media, transmedia, and gaming - although his work has always been heavily influenced by music, music videos, film, and cinema.

Career 
Stott has been the creative director of four media companies: Retina Circus (1997-2008), Bellyfeel (2008-present), Heroes Villains Gamers (2017-2022), and Indolent Games (2021-present). All these companies have been based in Northern England of the UK.

Retina Circus: 1997-2008

Namaste MPC and interactive film projects (1997-2002) 
Around 1996 Stott formed the media company Retina Circus in order to produce and direct the film Namaste MPC (1997). This short (30 minute) film starred Bruce Magill (then lead singer with the Manchester band The Flunkies) as one of three young criminals. With a ‘dark comic book ethos’ the film used ‘fragmenting narration, and innovative cinematography’ to tell its tale of obsession and betrayal. The film went on to be selected for screenings at the Leeds International Film Festival (1997) and Raindance film festival (1998).

Stott was also experimenting with digital media at this time, associated with the collective at the legendary electronic arts centre funded in part by Manchester City Council which in 1999 re-located to the formerly derelict The Deaf Institute (since 2008 one of Manchester’s most iconic gig venues). During this period Stott created and produced a number of innovatory and progressively more sophisticated interactive programs, seen to be at the cutting edge of the emergent digital revolution of the day. These included the interactive CD-ROM Blues Player (2000); the guerrilla interactive film, NTR (2001), promoting the final Big Audio Dynamite album Entering a New Ride (1999); and a collaboration with the musician Barry Adamson on an interactive music video, Interface (2002).

With his strong links to the music industry, both as former performing musician and his work on the Big Audio Dynamite and Barry Adamson projects, Stott fell into the orbit of the then up and coming Manchester band I Am Kloot.

I Am Kloot music videos and concert film (2003-2005) 
Formed in Manchester in 1999 by vocalist/guitarist John Bramwell with bassist Peter Jobson and drummer Andy Hargreaves, I Am Kloot were an English rock band which eventually disbanded after substantial success in 2016. In 2003, while working on their self-titled second album, I Am Kloot asked Stott to collaborate with them for the music video for their lead single. This collaboration would go on to last some three years and produce another two videos and a concert film.

The collaboration began with the single 'Life in a Day' (2003). For the video, Stott filmed a numbers of scenes using fake security cameras, creating a montage of hundreds of fragmentary shots unfolding to tell a story of ‘feral night-time Manchester’. Stott went on to create two more videos for the band from the same album: 'From Your Favourite Sky' (2004) and 'Proof (2004). For 'Proof' Stott secured the participation of Christopher Eccleston (Doctor Who, 24 Hour Party People, 28 Days Later) who gave an intense performance with a video focusing upon the affects of the actor’s face. 'From Your Favourite Sky' was essentially a live performance video, although composed from shots taken from a number of gigs from I Am Kloot’s late 2003 tour of UK and Europe. For one of these gigs – the homecoming concert at Manchester’s The Ritz – Stott directed a six camera unit to film the whole event. Eight of the song performances were released as Live At The Ritz 2003, the second DVD disc of a special edition of I Am Kloot’s third album Gods and Monsters (2005).

Crimeface and towards transmedia (2003-2008) 
In parallel with his collaborations with I Am Kloot, Stott was also continuing to experiment with interactive media, building upon his work of the early 2000s. These experiments took the form of a project called Crimeface, which would see Stott embrace in a single project many of the different media formats he had been concerned with throughout his career so far. In this way, as Crimeface developed and went through a number of iterations, Stott’s diverse and multimedia approach to art saw the project evolve manifesting itself as a transmedia enterprise. In so doing, Stott would go on to restructure his production ethos and methods, eventually marking this transition during 2008 by launching the Bellyfeel production house, and subsequently closing down Retina Circus.

During its development, Crimeface exploited a number of popular entertainment formats such as film, literature, music, and gaming. The story and scripts were written by Richard Davis and Stott. Later live action sequences were filmed with David Crellin (Emmerdale, The Cops,, Coronation Street), long-time Stott collaborator Wayne Simmonds, and Craig Cheetham (Life on Mars, Peter Kay's Max & Paddy's Road to Nowhere, Hollyoaks, Lennon Naked). The storyworld centred upon Detective Harry Adams of the Modern Device Crime Unit who enlists hacker Tranz Van Zandt to help solve a murder. The early versions of Crimeface intermixed filmic-narration and game-play, and were available in various formats including CD-ROM and online. However, as the material accumulated Stott and Davis began re-scripting and re-working the story for a final interactive film version. In order to focus efforts on this production, Stott launched Bellyfeel. Initially a distribution affiliate, the future would see Bellyfeel become the centre of Stott’s transmedia enterprises.

Bellyfeel: 2008-present

Crimeface and People’s Stories (2008-2010)

During late 2007 and early 2008 Stott reworked Crimeface into its final form: an interactive film – or more specifically, a serialised drama utilising a hybrid of text, video/film, animation, and sound/music. In this capacity, the drama was distributed on the internet for computers, tablets, and mobile phones. The film appears in one of two windows, with the second window opening onto interactive story elements in multiple media formats, where with a click of the mouse players can explore the world of Crimeface without leaving the film. The experience, according to Aleks Krotoski, technology and interactivity writer at The Guardian, ‘pushes the notion of interactivity and play into a different game space’. However, a recording of a pass through the drama was also created as a film and shown at several cinemas during 2008. Crimeface - the interactive version - went on to win both the Webby and People's Voice awards prizes for the Online Film & Video - Experimental category at the 2008 Webby Awards. The success of Crimeface 'changed everything' – before this Stott 'had spent a lot of time knocking on doors and getting rejected'. 'All of a sudden,' says Stott 'I win an award and everyone wants to talk to me'.

Foremost amongst the opportunities that appeared in the wake of Crimeface was a collaboration with award winning filmmaker Terence Davies on a companion piece to his documentary film Of Time and the City (2008). Working for producers Sol Papadopoulos and Roy Boulter at Hurricane Films, and with Heritage Lottery funding, Stott developed the interactive website People’s Stories: Liverpool Lives. Launched in 2010, actors Jonathan Pryce, Alexei Sayle, and Joe McGann contributed their own memories of the city to promote the site, a place for members of the public to upload and share their stories, films, or photographs. Papadopoulos commented: ‘We had Liverpudlians from all over the world wanting to tell their story, inspired by the way Terence had told his’. Stott described the project as 'a community-based site of user generated content for Liverpudlians and the scouse diaspora'.

The Alexander Wilson Project and Bolton Storyworld (2009-2016) 
For the first major Bellyfeel initiated project, Stott wanted to create something ‘[t]ruly transmedia […] composed of granular multimedia content,’ and this meant ‘starting with a storyworld’. Beginning by envisioning an imaginary UK town called Sheerport, Stott, the team at Bellyfeel, and collaborating creators began releasing various media including live events, games, short films, and animations. Running from 2009 to 2011 collaborators included writer Richard Davies and Philip Shotton, an iconic director / cinematographer and inventor of the term Madchester. The project – existing under the umbrella title of The Alexander Wilson Project – was an ever evolving series of diverse media events which together wove a thriller story wider in scope than Stott had ever achieved before. During the production process The Alexander Wilson Project caught the attention of Anna Zaluczkowska, then senior lecturer and programme leader for Media, Writing and Production at the University of Bolton, England, as well as an award-winning film-maker and writer in her own right. In 2011 she published a contextual study of The Alexander Wilson Project in the Journal of Screenwriting entitled 'Storyworld: the Bigger Picture, investigating the world of multi-platform/transmedia production and its affect on storytelling processes'. In the essay she claimed that the concept of granular content (GC) was a major innovation: 'This approach, in my opinion, signals something new and exciting for screenwriters. Could GC be a technique that helps link elements and provide continuity?'

Stott’s next project would go on to explore and innovate in another but related aspect of transmedia storytelling – the role of the audience and their active participation in constructing this continuity. Truly epic in scale, what would become known as Bolton Storyworld would last some five years, evolve through several incarnations, and – in its final incarnation – win awards. It began with the question – what if the creative process was decentralised and the audience were enabled to create their own media within an envisioned storyworld? The project was initiated in 2011 when Zaluczkowska invited Stott to consult on a project called Here and Now at Bolton University. Stott worked with the students to help them create a series of characters who posted on Facebook in character which assembled a drama through their interactions. While controversial, the project also secured major funding and year on year, evolved with the production of short films launched on YouTube, live events, music videos, gaming, and all with elements released through sequenced delivery via text and email. In 2013 Bellyfeel took over full creative control and using the media archive created a narrative from the disparate elements of the storyworld. This transmedia experience – which took the form of a conspiracy thriller – was named Bolton Storyworld: Codename Winterhill and ran for the first time in October 2014. After being refined during 2015, the experience attained its final form in 2016. The experience went on to be selected for The Seattle Transmedia and Independent Film Festival (2016), and later that year, win the prestigious Premier Award at the Learning on Screen Awards. The critical consensus from the judging panel being that ‘this outstanding production’ was an ‘'innovative and immersive piece of digital storytelling' and ‘unlike anything the jury have seen before’. In 2019, an artefact film version of the 2016 experience was released.

Set the Storyworld to Random and industry influencer (2015-present) 
During this period, and as a consequence of the success of Crimeface, The Alexander Wilson Project, and Bolton Storyworld, Stott would – as with his work with Bolton University – emerge as an industry consultant, media sector mentor, event speaker, and opinion piece writer. In 2015, Stott would go on to publish a book drawn from many of these activities. With the title Set the Storyworld to Random: How to Connect with Modern Transmedia Audiences (2015), the book set out to explore where new technology was taking storytelling in the context of contemporary media and new storytelling methods: transmedia, interactive, multiplatform events. Since the publication of the book, Stott’s profile as an industry influencer has grown. In 2022 he delivered a talk called ‘Beyond Fortnite and Among Us - Live Group Gaming Experiences for the Uninitiated’ at Digital Dragons (the leading European games industry conference) held in Krakow, Poland. 

Also in 2022 Stott was the host and curator of The Modern Audience Conference. Co-established by Leeds Beckett University’s Leeds School of Arts and Leeds Arts Research Centre. The event focused upon interactive storytelling through video games, social media, marketing and other modern media formats. Stott and Bellyfeel secured the participation of headline speakers such as three-time Emmy Awards winner Bernie Su (The Lizzie Bennet Diaries, Emma Approved), Nier: Automata video game director Yoko Taro, and writer on the game Disco Elysium, Justin Keenan.

Over the period of his Bellyfeel productions and as industry influencer three major themes would evolve through Stott’s book, speaking engagements, and media sector mentoring: the opportunities at the cutting edge of ever-evolving media technologies, the co-constitution between stories as granular content and documented storyworlds, and the foregrounding role of an active, participatory audience. This would lead Stott increasingly to explore the gaming element of storyworlds, in what he would come to call story-games.

Story-games: Secret Story Network and Clive is a Good Guy (2017-present) 

A key event in technology – as Stott suggested to Nataly Ríos Goicoechea in an interview in 2017 – happened with the rise of voice-over-IP (VoIP) instant messaging (IM) services, such as WhatsApp, with their freeware, cross-platform services allowing users to send text and voice messages, make voice and video calls, and share images, documents, and other content. Stott realised the opportunity such services would have for mobile users to participate in story events. So was born the Secret Story Network (commonly abbreviated as SSN), an online interactive storytelling experience which operates live role-playing games (RPGs or LARPs). Hosted over WhatsApp, stories at SSN led events are specially commissioned and have included transmedia tie-ins, such as with Freemantle for the Australian soap opera Neighbours and with the tabletop role-playing game Titan Effect. In 2018, and with Arts Council England National Lottery funding, the release of the first full season of stories occurred. Richard Adams from TECHnique wrote that SSN was a space to 'create compelling stories and unforgettable user experiences'. With the COVID-19 pandemic, in 2020 SSN would collaborate with The Lawrence Batley Theatre (Huddersfield, West Yorkshire) with LBTV, a ‘free platform of creative content’. A new season of SSN story-games ran over a nine week period from March to May.
 Further seasons appeared during the following years, with new stories with new audiences. The development of a SSN web-app was completed in 2022, and, as Stott announced at his talk at the Digital Dragons conference, in the very near future participants would be able to run their own stories.

To experiment further with mobile story-games (an reminiscent of his early digital media work of the later 1990s and early 2000s with Blues Player, NPR and Interface), Stott launched the company Heroes Villains Gamers, a Bellyfeel subsidiary. Focusing upon mobile gaming, a number of short experimental games were released beginning with Mid Game Crisis (2017). A 'left-field and somewhat bizarre tale on the subject of divorce', the aim was to deliver 'an emotionally impactful user engagement'. In October 2022, Stott announced via his new channels an interactive smartphone storygame featuring highly reactive split screen and full motion video battle royale sequences. Originally titled The Mirror Gag but later retitled to Clive is a Good Guy the narration concerns someone looking into a mirror and encountering multiple iterations of them-self. The story-game stars Neil Bell (Shameless, 24 Hour Party People, Dead Man's Shoes, Dune) in multiple roles.

Mediography

References 

1968 births
Living people
English film directors
English film producers
English-language film directors
Web series directors
Web series producers
Video game writers
Creative directors
Transmedia storytelling